Anthony Stephens (born 9 July 1986) is a British swimmer who has participated in three Paralympic Games, winning five medals. He competes in S5 classification events.

Career
Stephens began swimming at the age of three and by eight he was competing in national events. In 2003 he entered the British Championships taking gold in both the 200m Freestyle and 150m Individual Medley. He was selected for the Great Britain team in the 2004 Summer Paralympics in Athens. There he competed in seven events, the 50m, 100m and 200m Freestyle (S5), the 50m Backstroke (S5), 200m Individual Medley (S5) and the 4x50m Freestyle (20pts) and 4x50m Medley (20pts) relays.

Notes

Living people
1986 births
English male swimmers
Paralympic swimmers of Great Britain
Swimmers at the 2004 Summer Paralympics
Swimmers at the 2008 Summer Paralympics
Swimmers at the 2012 Summer Paralympics
Paralympic silver medalists for Great Britain
Paralympic bronze medalists for Great Britain
World record holders in paralympic swimming
Medalists at the 2004 Summer Paralympics
Medalists at the 2008 Summer Paralympics
S5-classified Paralympic swimmers
Team Bath swimmers
Team Bath Paralympic athletes
Medalists at the World Para Swimming European Championships
Paralympic medalists in swimming
British male freestyle swimmers
British male medley swimmers
British male backstroke swimmers
21st-century British people